Punnala Sreekumar is the general secretary of Kerala Pulayar Maha Sabha. He was re-elected during the 51st State Conference held at Kozhikode.

References

Kerala politicians
Living people
Year of birth missing (living people)